Gabe Polsky (born May 3, 1979) is an American film director, writer and producer.

Early life
Polsky was born to Soviet immigrants, and raised in the Chicago area. He attended the Hotchkiss School. After graduating, he went to Yale University, where he played NCAA hockey. He competed on Team USA in hockey at the 1997 Maccabiah Games in Israel, winning a silver medal.

Career
Polsky wrote, directed, and produced the feature documentary Red Penguins, which premiered at the 2019 Toronto International Film Festival. The film was released by Universal Pictures in August 2020. Red Penguins tells the true story of opportunism run amok in Moscow shortly after the collapse of the Soviet Union. It was nominated for a Critics' Choice Movie Award and a Writers Guild of America Award.

In 2018 Polsky wrote, directed, and produced In Search of Greatness. The film features interviews with sports icons Wayne Gretzky, Pelé, and Jerry Rice. In April 2018, the film was nominated for a Writers Guild of America Award.

In 2014, Polsky wrote, directed, and produced Red Army, a documentary film which chronicles the rise and fall of the Soviet Union through its ice hockey team. Red Army was executive produced by Jerry Weintraub and Werner Herzog, and premiered at the Cannes Film Festival. It was released in theaters by Sony Pictures Classics on January 22, 2015.

A. O. Scott of The New York Times called Red Army a "stirring, crazy story—a Russian novel of Tolstoyan sweep and Gogl-esque absurdity." Time magazine said: "this playful, poignant film presents a human story that transcends decades, borders and ideologies."

Red Army was the only documentary included in the official selections at the 2014 Cannes, Telluride, Toronto, New York, and AFI, film festivals. Red Army won audience awards at the 2014 AFI, Chicago and Middleburg film festivals.

In 2017 Polsky was an executive producer on the Genius series on National Geographic. He and his brother Alan acquired the rights to the Einstein estate and the book Einstein: His Life and Universe by Walter Isaacson.

Polsky and Alan Polsky, his brother, co-directed and produced The Motel Life (2013), starring Emile Hirsch, Dakota Fanning, and Stephen Dorff. The film was released in November 2013 and was based on the novel of the same name by Willy Vlautin.

Polsky produced Werner Herzog's Bad Lieutenant: Port of Call New Orleans. Roger Ebert named the film as among the top 10 best mainstream films of 2009, and then included it in his list of the best films of the decade. Polsky produced His Way, an Emmy-nominated documentary about Jerry Weintraub released by HBO in 2011. As of 2009, he is adapting the novels Butcher's Crossing by John Edward Williams and Flowers for Algernon by Daniel Keyes.

In 2021, it was announced that Polsky is directing his adaptation of the John Williams novel, Butcher’s Crossing, starring Nicolas Cage. The story is about a young Harvard University  dropout who seeks his destiny out West by tying his fate to a team of buffalo hunters.

References

External links

American film producers
Living people
1979 births
Place of birth missing (living people)
Yale Bulldogs men's ice hockey players
Maccabiah Games competitors for the United States
Competitors at the 1997 Maccabiah Games